William Edward Reynolds (November 28, 1928 – January 8, 1989), nicknamed "Bunk", was an American Negro league second baseman who played in the 1940s.

A native of Stone Mountain, Georgia, Reynolds attended Mansfield High School and played for the Cleveland Buckeyes in 1948. In 12 recorded games with the Buckeyes, he posted 8 hits and 5 RBI in 42 plate appearances. Reynolds died in Mansfield, Ohio in 1989 at age 60.

References

External links
 and Seamheads

1928 births
1989 deaths
Cleveland Buckeyes players
Baseball second basemen
21st-century African-American people